Esteve is a Spanish international pharmaceutical company headquartered in Barcelona. Since its founding in 1929, Esteve has extended its commercial activity to more than 100 countries around the world.

History
The company's origins date back to 1929, when Dr. Antoni Esteve i Subirana, researcher and entrepreneur, founded the firm. Now the family-owned company has around 2,900 employees and operates in different countries and continents, through subsidiary companies in Europe and the US and through production centers in Mexico and China, with products directly present in 40 countries and indirectly present, through licensing and distribution agreements, in over 60 countries around the world.

Company focus
Esteve focuses mainly on two health-related fields: the pharmaceutical field and the active pharmaceutical ingredient field, or fine chemistry. In the pharmaceutical field, Esteve has activities in research and development (R&D) of innovative medicines, particularly in pain and other areas with unmet therapeutic needs, based on both in-house and collaborative R&D programs as well as on innovative formulations. In 2017 for example, Esteve invested in the development of alternative treatments to strong opioids. In the chemical field, the company focuses on the development of new processes, production and commercialization of active pharmaceutical ingredients.

References

External links 
  

Biotechnology companies of Spain
Pharmaceutical companies of Spain
Manufacturing companies based in Barcelona